A catalog number is an identification number assigned to a purchasable product by an organization which sells goods.

It is similar to the concept of a stock keeping unit

References 

Identifiers